Kathleen Norris (born July 27, 1947) is a poet and essayist.

Biography 
Kathleen Norris was born in Washington, D.C., on July 27, 1947. As a child, Norris moved to Hawaii with her parents, John Norris and Lois Totten, and in 1965 graduated from Punahou Preparatory School. Growing up, she spent most summers in her grandparents' town, Lemmon, South Dakota.

After graduating from Bennington College in Vermont in 1969, Norris became arts administrator of the Academy of American Poets, and published her first book of poetry two years later. In 1974 she inherited her grandparents' farm in Lemmon, South Dakota, and moved there with her husband David Dwyer. In Lemmon, she joined Spencer Memorial Presbyterian church, and discovered the spirituality of the Great Plains. In 1986, Norris started writing non-fiction after becoming a Benedictine oblate at Assumption Abbey in Richardton, North Dakota, and spending extended periods at Saint John's Abbey in Collegeville, Minnesota. At this period in her career, one of her focuses was death and depression. In 1998, Norris gave the Mandeleva Lecture at St. Mary's College in Indiana, a lecture which became the basis for The Quotidian Mysteries: Laundry, Liturgy and "Women’s Work". After the death of her husband in 2003, Norris transferred her place of residence back to Hawaii.

Published books

Non-Fiction
Dakota: A Spiritual Geography. Houghton Mifflin Company, Boston/New York City 1993,  (pbk.) (awarded "Notable Book" status by The New York Times)
The Cloister Walk (1996)
Amazing Grace: A Vocabulary of Faith (1998)
The Quotidian Mysteries: Laundry, Liturgy and "Women's Work" (1998)
The Virgin of Bennington (2001)
The Holy Twins: Benedict and Scholastica (2001)
Acedia and Me: A Marriage, Monks, And A Writer's Life  (2008)

Poetry
Falling Off (1971)
The Middle of the World (1981)
The Year of Common Things (1988)
Little Girls in Church (1995)
Journey: New and Selected Poems, 1969–1999. University of Pittsburgh Press, Pittsburgh, Pennsylvania 2001, .

Norris has also been a regular contributor to such magazines as Christian Century.

References

External links
Interview with Kathleen Norris Part I and Part II
  Interview with Kathleen Norris

1947 births
20th-century Christian mystics
Living people
Bennington College alumni
Punahou School alumni
Roman Catholic mystics
Christian writers
Benedictine oblates
American religious writers
Women religious writers
American spiritual writers
Poets from Washington, D.C.
Poets from Hawaii
People from Lemmon, South Dakota
Poets from South Dakota
American women poets
American women essayists
20th-century American poets
20th-century American women writers
20th-century American essayists
21st-century American women writers